Selenide, water dikinase 1 is an enzyme that in humans is encoded by the SEPHS1 gene.

This protein functions as an enzyme that synthesizes selenophosphate from selenide and ATP. Selenophosphate is the selenium donor used to synthesize selenocysteine, which is co-translationally incorporated into selenoproteins at in-frame UGA codons.

References

Further reading